Utricularia aurea, the golden bladderwort, is a medium- to large-sized suspended aquatic carnivorous plant that belongs to the genus Utricularia (family Lentibulariaceae). It is the most common and widespread suspended aquatic species in Asia. Its native distribution ranges from India to Japan and Australia.

See also 
 List of Utricularia species

References 

aurea
Carnivorous plants of Asia
Carnivorous plants of Australia
Flora of China
Flora of tropical Asia
Flora of Japan
Flora of Korea
Flora of New South Wales
Flora of Queensland
Flora of the Northern Territory
Eudicots of Western Australia
Plants described in 1790